Eagle Springs is an unincorporated community in Moore County, North Carolina,  United States,  situated near the southern terminus of North Carolina Highway 705, on North Carolina Highway 211, west of Elberta, the southern terminus of North Carolina Highway 705. It lies at an elevation of 673 feet (205 m).  The ZIP Code for Eagle Springs is 27242.

The North Carolina Department of Juvenile Justice and Delinquency Prevention previously operated the Samarkand Youth Development Center (YDC), a correctional facility for delinquent girls, in the area. The  complex first opened in 1918 and did not have a fence.

References

Sources

Unincorporated communities in North Carolina
Unincorporated communities in Moore County, North Carolina